Domaikia is a town located in the municipality of Zuia, in the province of Álava (Araba), in the autonomous community of Basque Country, northern Spain.

External links
 DOMAIKIA in the Bernardo Estornés Lasa - Auñamendi Encyclopedia (Euskomedia Fundazioa) 

Towns in Álava